Massinga District is a district of Inhambane Province in south-east Mozambique. Its principal town is Massinga. The district is located at the east of the province and borders with Inhassoro District in the north, Vilanculos District in the northeast, Morrumbene District in the south, and with Funhalouro District in the west. In the east, the district is bounded by the Indian Ocean. In terms of the area, this is the biggest district of Inhambane Province. It has a population of 184,531 as of 2007.

Geography
There are no rivers in the district which flow throughout the whole year, only streams generated by rain.

History
In 1894, Massinga Military Command was established, thus bringing part of the area under the control of the military. In 1897, this part was subordinated to Gaza District, and in 1907, it was transferred to Inhambane District, thus bringing all current area of Massinga District, under both civil and military rule, into Inhambane District. Later in the same year, the military rule was abolished, and Massinga Circunscrição, a type of administrative unit used in Portuguese colonies in Africa, was established. In July 1986, a new administrative division of Mozambique was introduced, and Massinga District was established.

Administrative divisions
The district is divided into two postos, Massinga (three localities) and Chicomo (two localities).

Demographics
As of 2005, 43% of the population of the district was younger than 15 years. 17% did speak Portuguese. The population was predominantly speaking Chopi language. 59% were analphabetic, mostly women.

Economy
In 2005, 1% of the households in the district had electricity.

Agriculture
In 2005, the district had 42,000 farms exploiting on average the area of  each. The main agricultural products are maize, cassava, cowpea, peanuts, sweet potatoes, cotton, and rice.

Transportation
There is a road network in the district which includes the  stretch of the national road EN1, crossing the eastern part of the district, and about  secondary roads.

References

Districts in Inhambane Province
States and territories established in 1986